In fencing, a riposte (French for "retort") is an offensive action with the intent of hitting one's opponent made by the fencer who has just parried an attack. In military usage, a riposte is the strategic device of hitting a vulnerable point of the enemy, thereby forcing them to abandon their own attack.

In everyday language, a riposte is synonymous with a retort and describes a quick and witty reply to an argument or an insult.

Etymology
In sabre and foil, the priority switches when the parry is successfully executed; the defending fencer now has right of way and may immediately attack with a riposte. The riposte may be direct, or may include compound footwork. If the riposte is delayed, the original attacker's remise gains priority. Riposte is analogous to kaeshi techniques in kendo.

When one sets up a second intention attack, the reactions of one's opponent must be predicted. A fencer may execute an attack expecting to be parried, preparing to counter-parry and counter-riposte.

Military usage
André Beaufre defines riposte in military usage as the act of striking a vulnerable point of an enemy, forcing them to abandon their own attack. The chosen target must be vital to the enemy or at least highly important, so that it becomes imperative to the enemy to defend it. The overall objective is to regain the initiative in battle.

References

Fencing